The Jefferson City Metropolitan Statistical Area, as defined by the United States Census Bureau, is an area consisting of four counties – Cole, Callaway, Moniteau, and Osage – in central Missouri anchored by the city of Jefferson City.  As of the 2010 census, the MSA had a population of  149,807.  The Jefferson City MSA consists of four counties, and borders the Columbia metropolitan area to the north.

Counties
Cole
Callaway
Moniteau
Osage

Communities

Places with more than 40,000 inhabitants
Jefferson City (Principal city) Pop: 43,079

Places with 1,000 to 15,000 inhabitants
Fulton Pop: 12,790
California Pop: 4,278
Tipton Pop: 3,262
Holts Summit Pop: 3,247
Belle (partial) Pop: 1,545
Wardsville Pop: 1,506
Linn Pop:  1,459
St. Martins Pop: 1,140

Places with less than 1,000 inhabitants
Auxvasse Pop: 983
Taos Pop: 878
Russellville Pop: 807
New Bloomfield Pop: 669
Bland (partial) Pop: 539
Freeburg Pop: 437
Westphalia Pop: 389
Chamois Pop: 386
Jamestown Pop: 386
Lake Mykee Town Pop: 350
Clarksburg Pop: 334
Centertown Pop:  278
St. Thomas Pop: 263
Meta Pop: 229
Lohman Pop: 163
Argyle (partial) Pop: 162
Kingdom City Pop: 128
Mokane Pop: 125
Lupus Pop: 33

Unincorporated places
Bonnots Mill
Cedar City
Elston
Eugene 
Folk
Fortuna
Frankenstein
Henley
High Point
Koeltztown
Latham
Loose Creek
McGirk
Portland
Rich Fountain
Tebbetts
Williamsburg

Demographics
As of the census of 2000, there were 140,052 people, 51,637 households, and 35,569 families residing within the MSA. The racial makeup of the MSA was 90.12% White, 7.12% African American, 0.38% Native American, 0.64% Asian, 0.03% Pacific Islander, 0.52% from other races, and 1.19% from two or more races. Hispanic or Latino of any race were 1.29% of the population.

The median income for a household in the MSA was $39,692, and the median income for a family was $46,720. Males had a median income of $29,922 versus $22,678 for females. The per capita income for the MSA was $17,900.

See also
Missouri census statistical areas
List of cities in Missouri
List of villages in Missouri

References

 
Metropolitan areas of Missouri